Toronto Area Control Center  is one of seven area control centers in Canada operated by Nav Canada. The Toronto Area Control Centre is based near Toronto Pearson International Airport in Mississauga, Ontario.

From the Toronto Area Control Centre, air traffic controllers provide en route and terminal control services to aircraft in the Toronto Flight Information Region (FIR). The Toronto FIR airspace covers most of Southern Ontario, Central Ontario, parts of Eastern Ontario, and parts of northwestern Michigan. To the east are the air traffic control centres of Montreal and Boston; to the south are the Minneapolis, Cleveland (which covers the extreme southwestern area of Ontario), and New York air traffic control centres; to the west is the Winnipeg control centre.

Aerodrome classes
The Toronto ACC assumes control of the following classes of airports:

Class C (Controlled, IFR/IFR, IFR/VFR and VFR/VFR separation, VFR: Mode C and ATC clearance required)
 CYYZ - Toronto Pearson International Airport in Mississauga, ON
 CYKF - Region of Waterloo International Airport in Breslau, ON
 CYXU - London International Airport in London, ON
 CYTZ - Billy Bishop Toronto City Airport (Toronto island) in Toronto, ON

Class D (Controlled, IFR/IFR and IFR/VFR separation, VFR: 2-way communication required)
 CYHM - John C. Munro Hamilton International Airport in Hamilton, ON
 CYOO - Oshawa Airport in Oshawa, ON
 CYAM - Sault Ste. Marie Airport in Sault Ste. Marie, ON
 CYTR - Trenton Airport in Trenton, ON

Class E (Controlled, only IFR/IFR spacing)
 CYKZ - Buttonville Municipal Airport in Markham, ON
 CYXR - Earlton (Timiskaming Regional) Airport in Eartton, ON
 CYEL - Elliot Lake Airport in Elliot Lake, ON
 CYZE - Gore Bay-Manitoulin Airport in Gore Bay/Barrie Island, ON
 CYYU - Kapuskasing Airport in Kapuskasing, ON
 CYGK - Kingston/Norman Rogers Airport in Kingston, ON
 CYMO - Moosonee Airport in Moosonee, ON
 CYQA - Muskoka Airport in Muskoka, ON
 CYYB - North Bay/Jack Garland Airport in North Bay, ON
 CYPQ - Peterborough Airport in Peterborough, ON
 CYZR - Sarnia Chris Hadfield Airport in Sarnia, ON
 CYSN - St. Catharines/Niagara District Airport in Niagara-on-the-Lake, ON
 CYSB - Sudbury Airport in Sudbury, ON
 CYTS - Timmins Airport in Timmins, ON
 CYZD - Toronto/Downsview Airport in Toronto, ON
 CYXZ - Wawa Airport in Wawa, ON
 CYVV - Wiarton Airport in Wiarton, ON

This FIR contains several Class G aerodromes that are in uncontrolled airspace and clearances are required to enter or leave controlled airspace.

Airports under these classes include:

 CPZ9 - Billy Bishop Toronto City Water Aerodrome in Toronto
 CZBA - Burlington Air Park in Burlington, ON

Peripheral station (PAL) frequencies
Within each FIR, there are transmitter sites that allow the relay of distant communication from aircraft back to the ACC. These links are called a  peripheral station (PAL). They re-transmit the voice and data communication over high speed data links between the ACC and the remote transmitter.

See also
 Canadian airspace

References

Air traffic control centers
Buildings and structures in Mississauga
Aviation in Ontario
Air traffic control in Canada
Toronto Pearson International Airport